Bromomethyl ethyl ketone is a brominated ketone with lachrymatory effects. It was used as a chemical warfare agent in World War I. Bromomethyl ethyl ketone was developed as an alternative to bromoacetone, because acetone, the precursor to bromoacetone, was required for explosives production.

See also
Bromoacetone
Chloroacetone
Iodoacetone
Bromobenzyl cyanide
Chloroacetophenone
Ethyl bromoacetate
Ethyl iodoacetate

References

Lachrymatory agents
Ketones
Organobromides
World War I chemical weapons